Cooch Behar Lok Sabha constituency is one of the 543 parliamentary constituencies in India. The constituency centres on Cooch Behar in West Bengal. All the seven assembly segments of No. 1 Cooch Behar Lok Sabha constituency are in Cooch Behar district. The seat is reserved for scheduled castes.

Assembly segments

As per order of the Delimitation Commission in respect of the delimitation of constituencies in the West Bengal, parliamentary constituency no. 1 Coochbehar, reserved for Scheduled castes (SC), is composed of the following segments from 2009:

The area under the Mathabhanga subdivision of the Cooch Behar district will constitute the assembly constituencies of Mathabhanga and Sitalkuchi, whereas the area under the Dinhata subdivision will form the constituencies of Dinahata and Sitai. The area under Cooch Behar Sadar subdivision will form Cooch Behar Uttar, Cooch Behar Dakshin and Natabari constituencies, though Natabari will contain gram panchayats from Tufanganj subdivision also.

Members of Parliament

^ denotes by-polls

Election results

General election 2019

2016 by-election

2014 result

General election 2009

General election 2004

General election 1999

General election 1998

General elections 1957-2004
In 1951, Upendra Nath Barman, Birendra Nath Katham and Amiya Kanta Basu, all of Congress, won the North Bengal seat. The winners and runners-up from Cooch Behar for subsequent elections are shown below. In a (by-election) in 1958Nalini Ranjan Ghosh of Indian National Congress won.

See also
 List of Constituencies of the Lok Sabha

References

External links
Coochbehar lok sabha  constituency election 2019 date and schedule

Lok Sabha constituencies in West Bengal
Politics of Cooch Behar district